Majki Małe  is a village in the administrative district of Gmina Zawidz, Sierpc County, Masovian Voivodeship, Poland.

References

Villages in Sierpc County